Trampya was an ancient Greek city in the region of Epirus. Its site is unlocated, but near that of Bouneima.

See also
List of cities in ancient Epirus

References

Sources

Populated places in ancient Epirus
Cities in ancient Epirus
Lost ancient cities and towns